Just Kidding may refer to:

 Just Kidding (TV series), a Canadian children's series
 Just Kidding, a 1917 American comedy short film starring Billie Rhodes
 Just Kidding!, the UK title of Just Tricking, the first volume in the Just! book series by Andy Griffiths
 Just Kidding (Annie Bryant novel), the tenth book in the Beacon Street Girls young adult book series by Annie Bryant
 Just Kidding, a 1993 album by Treepeople
 Just Kidding, a comedy troupe featuring Jon Hein and Jon Glaser
 Just Kiddin, a British Electronic music production duo